A decimal representation of a non-negative real number  is its expression as a sequence of symbols consisting of decimal digits traditionally written with a single separator: 

Commonly,  if  The sequence of the —the digits after the dot—is generally infinite. If it is finite, the lacking digits are assumed to be 0.

The decimal representation represents the infinite sum:

Integer and fractional parts
The sequence of the  represents the number 

Finite decimal approximations

Any real number can be approximated to any desired degree of accuracy by rational numbers with finite decimal representations.

Assume . Then for every integer  there is a finite decimal  such that:

Proof:
Let , where .
(The fact that  has a finite decimal representation is easily established.)

Non-uniqueness of decimal representation and notational conventions

Some real numbers  have two infinite decimal representations. For example, the number 1 may be equally represented by 1.000... as by 0.999... (where the infinite sequences of trailing 0's or 9's, respectively, are represented by "..."). Conventionally, the decimal representation without trailing 9's is preferred.

Certain procedures for constructing the decimal expansion of  will avoid the problem of trailing 9's.  For instance, the following algorithmic procedure will give the standard decimal representation:  Given , we first define  (the integer part of ) to be the largest integer such that  (i.e.).  If  the procedure terminates.  Otherwise, for  already found, we define  inductively to be the largest integer such that:

It can be shown that  (conventionally written as ), where  and the nonnegative integer  is represented in decimal notation.

Types

Finite 

The decimal expansion of non-negative real number x will end in zeros (or in nines) if, and only if, x is a rational number whose denominator is of the form 2n5m, where m and n are non-negative integers.

Proof:

If the decimal expansion of x will end in zeros, or 
for some n, then the denominator of x is of the form 10n = 2n5n.

Conversely, if the denominator of x is of the form 2n5m,

for some p.
While x is of the form ,
 for some n.
By , x will end in zeros.

Infinite

Repeating decimal representations

Some real numbers have decimal expansions that eventually get into loops, endlessly repeating a sequence of one or more digits:
1/3 = 0.33333...
1/7 = 0.142857142857...
1318/185 = 7.1243243243...
Every time this happens the number is still a rational number (i.e. can alternatively be represented as a ratio of an integer and a positive integer).
Also the converse is true:  The decimal expansion of a rational number is either finite, or endlessly repeating.

Conversion to fraction

Every decimal representation of a rational number can be converted to a fraction by converting it into a sum of the integer, non-repeating, and repeating parts and then converting that sum to a single fraction with a common denominator.

For example to convert  to a fraction one notes the lemma:

Thus one converts as follows:

If there are no repeating digits one assumes that there is a forever repeating 0, e.g. , although since that makes the repeating term zero the sum simplifies to two terms and a simpler conversion.

For example:

See also
Decimal
Series (mathematics)
IEEE 754
Simon Stevin

References

Further reading
 
 

Mathematical notation
Articles containing proofs

br:Dispakadur dekredel
ckb:نواندنی دەدەیی